Stark's Vacuum Museum, also known as Stark's Vacuum Cleaner Museum, is a vacuum cleaner museum in Portland, Oregon. It showcases more than 100 vacuums from the late-1800s to the 1960s within a  x  section of the Stark's Vacuums store. Admission is free. Pieces include a 1930s cardboard model, a Duntley Pneumatic that attaches to the ceiling, an Electrolux on runners, and hand-pumped vacs.

Reception
The museum has been called "quirky" and included in lists highlighting the more peculiar aspects of Portland ("Keep Portland Weird"). In 2014, CNN reported that the museum averaged around a dozen visitors per month. USA Today called the guides "highly knowledgeable".

See also

 List of museums in Portland, Oregon

References

External links

 
 Stark's Vacuum Museum at Lonely Planet

Kerns, Portland, Oregon
Museums in Portland, Oregon
Northeast Portland, Oregon
Technology museums in the United States
Vacuum cleaners